Jeremy Everett (born 1979 in Colorado) is a contemporary artist who lives and works in Los Angeles.

Biography 

Everett has a BA in landscape architecture from Colorado University and an MA in visual studies from the Bruce Mau Institute in Toronto, Canada.

His work has been shown in Los Angeles, New York, Paris and Hong Kong, and at the Museum of Contemporary Art in Chicago. In 2015 he held a residency at Hooper Projects in Los Angeles.

Solo exhibitions 
 2009: Opium Feast, Roberts and Tilton, Los Angeles
 2011: One Night Stand, Asia Song Society, New York, United States
 2012: Flood, OFR Galerie, Paris
 2012: Buried Sky, Andrew Edlin Gallery, New York City
 2014: No Exit, Edouard Malingue Gallery, Hong Kong
 2015: Double Pour, Wilding Cran Gallery, Los Angeles, USA
 2016: Floy, Edouard Malingue Gallery, Hong Kong

References 

1979 births
American artists
Living people
University of Toronto alumni